Bart Bowen (born April 22, 1967 in Austin, Texas) is an American former cyclist. Professional from 1990 to 2000, he was most notably the National Road Champion in 1992 and 1997. He also won the Herald Sun Tour in 1992 and the Tour of Japan in 1997. Bowen participated six times at the World Road Championships with the American team.

In the 1993 Tour DuPont he was the second to fall in a twenty-man crash.

Today he trains other racers.

Palmarès

1992
United States National Road Race Championships
Philadelphia International Championship
Herald Sun Tour
2nd overall, Japan Cup
3rd overall, Giro dell' Etna

1993
Cascade Cycling Classic
2nd overall, Redlands Bicycle Classic

1994
1st stage of the Tour of Willamette

1995
2nd stage of West Virginia Classic
2nd overall, Lancaster Classic
3rd overall, Cascade Cycling Classic

1996
14th and 17th stages of the Fresca Classic

1997
United States National Road Race Championships
Tour of Japan:
General classification
1st stage
Tour of the Gila
4th stage of the Cascade Cycling Classic

1998
4th and 6th stages of the Cascade Cycling Classic

1999
Fitchburg Longsjo Classic

2000
2nd of the United States National Cyclo-cross Championships

References

1967 births
Living people
American male cyclists
Sportspeople from Austin, Texas